Said Tarabeek (April 17, 1941 – November 15, 2015) was an Egyptian film, television and stage actor. He was hospitalised after suffering from heart related problems, ultimately leading to a heart attack and his death.

Tarabeek's filmography includes Ragol Faqad Aqloh (A Man Who Lost his Mind, 1980) Salam Ya Sahby (Goodbye my Friend, 1986), Bakhit we Adila (1995), Omaret Yacoubian (The Yacoubian Building, 2006), Tabakh El-Rayess (The President's Chef, 2008), Boushkash (2008) and X-Large (2011).

References 

Egyptian actor Said Tarabeek dies at 74

1941 births
2015 deaths
20th-century Egyptian male actors
21st-century Egyptian male actors
Egyptian male film actors
Egyptian male stage actors
Egyptian male television actors